Jennifer Marcella Peña (born September 17, 1983) is an American Tejano/Latin pop singer who has sold over 3.5 million records internationally. Peña was born in San Antonio, Texas, and is the third and youngest daughter of Jaime and Mary Peña with other sisters Janet and Jackie. Peña is of Mexican descent native to the state of Texas, raised in Corpus Christi, Texas.

Career

Los Jetz 
Peña first achieved notoriety after performing at the Astrodome in Houston, Texas, during a Selena tribute concert in 1995 while under management with Q-Productions and Abraham Quintanilla Jr., who was Selena's father and former manager. This was Peña's first public performance on a grand scale performing Bidi Bidi Bom Bom, a #1 song for the late Latin superstar Selena. Peña's first studio album Dulzura released in May 1996 as part of Jennifer y Los Jetz was produced by Abraham Quintanilla III and introduced her to the music scene officially at the age of 12 with the title track and "Ven a mí" (a Spanish-language cover of The Drifters' "Dance with Me") garnered her a loyal fanbase. The album sold quite well in the Latin market, certified gold and winning several Tejano Music Awards. At the time Tejano Music was in its prime and Peña was another staple act in the scene. Her introduction was both praised and criticized mainly in part due to the artistic similarities between Selena and her. The comparisons came and went, but Peña managed to continue winning over fans. The year 1997 saw the release of her second  album, Jennifer Y Los Jetz , with the singles "Tu Castigo" and "Yo Te Vi",  being promoted and drawing the same level of success  Dulzura had achieved winning another gold certification.

In 1998, she released Mariposa with "Tengo Miedo" as the lead single, another hit in the Latin market, and in Mexico where she toured extensively, the album became Peña's third album to be certified gold. By 2000 Peña was the most prominent female Tejano singer for which had been long dubbed  La Princesa de la Música Tejana (The Princess Of Tejano Music) her most  commercially and critically  acclaimed album while under Q's management was 2000's Abrázame y Bésame, for which Peña was now billed as a solo act but still with band Los Jetz the album was produced by A.B. Quintanilla. Showcasing a more mature sound for Peña, the title track, a duet with former Kumbia Kings frontman DJ Kane, was the most successful single. Other hits – "Si Tú Te Vas", "Contigo Otra Vez", and "No Te Voy a Perdonar" – hit strong again in the US and in Mexico, garnering her a 2001 Grammy nomination and multiple Tejano Music Awards. Peña continued to promote and tour extensively after the release of every album under Q's management and with Label EMI Latin.

Univision Music Group and Latin pop venture 
After a few years of management under Q Productions, Peña signed with new label Univision Music Group, whose president had launched Selena's career while at EMI Latin, which he headed until 2000.

In 2002, Peña released Libre, produced by Rudy Pérez and Kike Santander. Rudy Pérez wrote the album's biggest hits: "Vamos al Mundial", which was chosen as the anthem for the 2002 FIFA World Cup on Univision; and "El Dolor de Tu Presencia", which catapulted Peña's popularity, spending eight consecutive weeks at #1 on Billboard's Hot Latin Tracks. "Entre el Delirio y la Locura" soon followed. Libre sold over 300,000 units. In 2003, Libre was nominated for a Grammy.

In 2004, Peña released her second album with UMG, Seducción, which was produced by Rudy Pérez, Gustavo and Kike Santander, and Emilio Estefan.  Rudy Pérez was the genius behind another #1 hit, "Vivo y Muero en Tu Piel". The album kept up the momentum of her previous release, again selling over 300,000 units.

In 2004, Peña performed to a crowd of over 61,000 fans at the Houston Livestock Show and Rodeo, a venue known for hosting major acts such as the Dixie Chicks, Garth Brooks, and Beyoncé. She also recorded a live album which was released later that same year. Following her commercial success, Peña performed for former United States President Bill Clinton and then current President President George W. Bush in 2006. She is actively involved with awareness campaigns of hepatitis, AIDS, and teen depression.

Peña has ventured into film, appearing in MTV's All You've Got (2006) with Ciara. She also appeared in Amexicano (2007).

On , Dicen que el tiempo was released, debuting at #16 on Billboard Top Latin Albums, with "Como Entender" being promoted as the first single, followed by "Tuya" in late April 2007. Since the release, both the album and single have garnered only a lukewarm reception, despite cracking the Top 25 positions on Billboard and selling out the initial shipment of 80,000 units. Peña is on hiatus after having promoted the album all across the US and Puerto Rico with TV slots on MTV Tr3s as the artist of the month and extensive radio promotion. The second single, "Tuya", reached its peak position at #5 on Billboard charts as of September 2007. "Dicen Que El Tiempo" did not fare well in sales in comparison  to previous efforts but did win Peña critical acclaim and was well received by fans. The album, although a departure from both her Pop Ballads and Tejano Sound, was produced by Jennifer and Sebastian Kyrs, with additional songwriting and production by Obie Bermúdez. On December 6, 2007, "Dicen Que El Tiempo" was nominated for a Grammy.

Personal life 
In April 2007, Peña announced on her official message board that she was engaged to Puerto Rican singer-songwriter Obie Bermúdez, and that they were expecting their first child.  They shared their good news again during an appearance on April 26, 2007, edition of "Mi TRL" on MTV Tr3s. The couple was married in a private ceremony in her home state of Texas on June 3, 2007. The couple welcomed their first child, a son, in November 2007. She later had a daughter, and third child in 2019. Currently Peña resides in Texas along with her husband.

Peña has taken up Christian music and has received a lot of praise for giving praise. She is currently singing at Church Unlimited.

Discography

Albums 

As Jennifer y Los Jetz
Dulzura (1996)
Jennifer (1997)
Mariposa (1998)
Abrázame y Bésame (2000)

As Jennifer Peña
Libre (2002)
Seducción (2004)
Houston Rodeo Live (2004)
Dicen Que El Tiempo (2007)

Singles 
Ven A Mi (1996)
Pura Dulzura (1996)
Tu Castigo (1997)
Yo Te Vi (1997)
Coranzoncito Ven A Mi (1998)
Si Tu Te Vas (2000)
Abrasame Y Besame (2000)
El Dolor De Tu Presencia (2002)
Entre El Delirio y la Locura (2003)
A Fuego Lento (2004)
Hasta El Fin Del Mundo (2004)
Vivo Y Muero En Tu Piel (2004)
No Hay Nadie Igual Como Tu (2004)
Si Yo Me Vuelve A Enamorar (2004)
Como Entender (2007)
Tuya (2007)

Awards and recognitions 

GRAMMY AWARDS and Latin Grammy 

1999 Best Tejano Performance " Mariposa " Nominated

2002 Best Mexican American Performance " Libre" Nominated

2007 Producer of the Year "Dicen Que El Tiempo" Nominated

2008 Best Latin Pop Album " Dicen Que El Tiempo" Latin Grammy Nominated

 BILLBOARD LATIN MUSIC AWARDS

2003 Hot Latin Track of The Year  ( El Dolor De Tu Presencia ) Nominated

2003 Pop Airplay Track of The Year  ( El Dolor De Tu Presencia) Nominated

2003 Regional Airplay Track of The Year ( El Dolor De Tu Presencia Norteno Version) Nominated

2003 Album of The Year  ( Libre) WIN 

 PREMIO LO NUESTRO

2004 Female Entertainer of The Year 

JOHNNY CANALES "U GOT IT" AWARDS 

1996 U Got It

TEJANO MUSIC AWARDS 

1997, 1998, 1999, 2001, 2003 Female Entertainer of The Year

1998 Most Promising Band

1999, 2001, 2003  Female Vocalist of The Year

 South Texas Music Awards 

2002, 2003  Female Vocalist of The Year

2002, 2003  Female Entertainer of The Year

Filmography 

 All You've Got (2006) DVD
Amexicano (2007) DVD
Top Chef VIP (2022) Reality Shop

References 

General sources

External links 

 Official Myspace site

1983 births
Living people
American musicians of Mexican descent
Hispanic and Latino American musicians
People from San Antonio
Tejano pop musicians
Spanish-language singers of the United States
21st-century American singers
21st-century American women singers
Hispanic and Latino American women singers
Women in Latin music